Chronów may refer to the following places in Poland:

Chronów, Lesser Poland Voivodeship
Chronów, Masovian Voivodeship
Chronów-Kolonia Dolna
Chronów-Kolonia Górna